Taj Mahmūd Amrōtī  (born in Deewani village, Khairpur, Sindh, 1857; died 1929) was a scholar, fighter against British control of India, and educationalist. He led the "Reshmi Roomal" and "Hijrat Movement" of protest emigration to Afghanistan. Amroti helped Khilafat Movement of Turkish Khilafat / Khalifah by sending financial help and troops of his followers, force named as Junood-e-Rabbani i.e. the Forces of Allah.

Amroti translated the Qurʾān into Sindhi, gave lectures, wrote books of poetry, and edited the monthly journal Ikhwān-ul-Muslimīn. A proponent of the non-cooperation movement in India, he was a leader of the Khilafat Movement and a founding member of Jamʿiyyat-i ʿUlamā-i Hind.

References

Bibliography
 

1857 births
1929 deaths
19th-century Indian educational theorists
Writers in British India
Sindhi people
Translators of the Quran into Sindhi
People from Khairpur District